Ambikapur is one of the 90 Legislative Assembly constituencies of Chhattisgarh state in India. It is in Surguja district.

Members of Legislative Assembly

Election results

2018

See also
List of constituencies of the Chhattisgarh Legislative Assembly
Surguja district

References

Surguja district
Assembly constituencies of Chhattisgarh